The CONMEBOL Preolímpico is an international association football event in the South America region organized by CONMEBOL. It is the qualification tournament for the football tournament at the Olympic Games.

In 1960, teams from North and Central America also entered the tournament. Before 1984, only junior or non-professional players were allowed to participate. In 1987 the competition opened to any player who had not played in World Cup (whether a qualifying match or at the final tournament). Since 1992 the COI ruled that only players under the age of 23 could participate in Olympic competitions. 

The tournament was not held between 2007 and 2015, as the South American Youth Championship was chosen as the qualifying tournament for the Olympic Games. The competition was re-introduced for the 2020 games.

Results

Notes

Performance by country

References

External links
 
 Pre-Olímpico - South-American Olympic Qualifying Tournament at the RSSSF 

 
CONMEBOL competitions
Football qualification for the Summer Olympics